Elachista minuta is a moth of the family Elachistidae that can be found in Spain and on Crete.

References

minuta
Moths described in 2003
Moths of Europe